Manga is a composite barrio (neighbourhood or district) of Montevideo, Uruguay.

Location
This barrio borders Colón Sudeste to the west, Canelones Department to the north and east, Peñarol, Casavalle, Manga, and Villa García to the south.

See also
Barrios of Montevideo

References

External links

Revista Raíces/ Historia del barrio Manga

Barrios of Montevideo